Sambhu Pan (3 January 1919 – 1987) was an Indian cricket umpire. He stood in nine Test matches between 1961 and 1969.

See also
 List of Test cricket umpires

References

1919 births
1987 deaths
Cricketers from Kolkata
Indian Test cricket umpires